Elm Township is one of twelve townships in Allen County, Kansas, United States. As of the 2010 census, its population was 1,257.

Geography
It contains one incorporated settlement, Gas, and surrounds another, the governmentally independent city of La Harpe. According to the USGS, it contains two cemeteries: La Harpe and Saint Johns.

Transportation
Elm Township contains two airports or landing strips: Midway Air Park and National Airport.

References
 USGS Geographic Names Information System (GNIS)

External links
 US-Counties.com
 City-Data.com

Townships in Allen County, Kansas
Townships in Kansas